Reuben Ross (born December 5, 1985) is a Canadian diver. He won a gold medal in the men's 3m or 3m synchronized events at the Canadian Nationals from 2008-2011 . Ross competed in the individual 3m springboard and 10m platform events at the 2008 Summer Olympics in Beijing. At the 2012 Summer Olympics, he competed in the 3m springboard synchronized event with Alexandre Despatie.

In 2011, Ross earned sixth place in the 3m event at the FINA World Championships. He won gold at the 2010 Commonwealth Games with Despatie in the 3m synchro adding to his individual silver in the 3m.

In 2012, he finished 10th in the 3m springboard event at the FINA World Cup and finished fifth in the 3m synchro event with partner Alexandre Despatie.

Ross grew up in Pilot Butte, Saskatchewan, and currently lives in Edmonton, Alberta with his wife and two children.

Accomplishments 

 2011: Gold medal on 3m at the Summer Senior National Championships in Edmonton
 2011: Gold medal on 3m synchro at the Winter Senior National Championships (with Alexandre Despatie)
 2010: Gold medal on 3m synchro springboard at the Commonwealth Games (with Alexandre Despatie)
 2009: Bronze medal on 3m synchro springboard at the World Aquatics Championships (with Alexandre Despatie)
 2009: Gold medal on 3m at ACC Conference championships
 2009: Gold medal on 1m and 3m at Winter Senior National Championships in Calgary
 2008: Gold medal on 3m at the NCAA Men's Div I Diving Championships
 2008: Gold medal on 3m, 10m and 10m synchro with Riley McCormick at the Winter Senior National Championships
 2006: Silver medal on 3m synchro and 4th place on 3m at the Summer Senior National Championships

Civil Engineering degree from the University of Miami.

External links 
 Profile on Diving Canada official site
 Personal diving blog

References 

1985 births
Living people
Olympic divers of Canada
Canadian male divers
Divers at the 2007 Pan American Games
Divers at the 2008 Summer Olympics
Divers at the 2010 Commonwealth Games
Divers at the 2011 Pan American Games
Divers at the 2012 Summer Olympics
Sportspeople from Regina, Saskatchewan
World Aquatics Championships medalists in diving
Commonwealth Games gold medallists for Canada
Commonwealth Games silver medallists for Canada
Commonwealth Games medallists in diving
Pan American Games competitors for Canada
Medallists at the 2010 Commonwealth Games